Musica Omnia is an American record label specializing in classical music. The label was founded in 2000 by Peter Watchorn, and through 2007, most issues were produced by him.

Although specializing in early music, the label has also released compositions by such contemporary composers as Julian Wachner. In 2002 the label was the winner of the New York Times Critic's Award, and subsequently acquired Record of the Year from Musicweb in both 2006 and 2009.

Big Daddy Records was the initial distributor but the label switched to distribution by Naxos Records in 2014. The label's initial goal was to provide liner notes of superior educational value.

References

Record labels established in 2000
American record labels
Classical music record labels